This is a list of notable events relating to the environment in 1971. They relate to environmental law, conservation, environmentalism and environmental issues.

Events
The Man and the Biosphere Programme was established by UNESCO to promote interdisciplinary approaches to management, research and education in ecosystem conservation and sustainable use of natural resources.

January 
The 1971 San Francisco Bay oil spill occurred when two Standard Oil tankers, the Arizona Standard and the Oregon Standard, collided in the San Francisco Bay, resulting in an  spill. It led  to the formation of a number of environmental organisations.

February 
The SS Wafra oil spill occurred when the ship experienced engine trouble and subsequently ran around near Cape Agulhas, South Africa, spilling 200,000 barrels of crude oil.

July 
In the United States the Oregon Bottle Bill (HB 1036) is signed into law. It is the first such legislation to pass in the US

September 
The Marine Reserves Act 1971 was passed into law in New Zealand.

October 
The International Convention for the Prevention of Pollution of the Sea by Oil was amended to protect the Great Barrier Reef

See also

Human impact on the environment
List of environmental issues